The Weißeritzkreis is a former district (Kreis) in the south of Saxony, Germany. Neighboring districts were (from west clockwise) Freiberg, Meißen, the district-free city Dresden, Sächsische Schweiz, and to the south it bordered the Czech Republic.

History 
The district was created in 1994 when the two districts Dippoldiswalde and Freital were merged. In August 2008, as a part of the district reform in Saxony, the districts of Sächsische Schweiz and Weißeritzkreis were merged into the new district Sächsische Schweiz-Osterzgebirge.

Geography 
The district is located in the Ore Mountains, the central part is the Tharandt Forest. The district got its name after the two rivers Wild Weißeritz and Red Weißeritz, who merge near Freital into the Weißeritz river, and then mouths into the Elbe in Dresden.

During the flooding in August 2002 the Weißeritz river had to drain many times the normal amount of water, and did destroy a lot of buildings in the river valley - houses, streets and bridges.

Partnerships
Rottweil
Berchtesgadener Land
Göttingen
Zollernalbkreis

Coat of arms

Towns and municipalities

External links 
  (German)
Website about the 2002 Flooding (German)

Sächsische Schweiz-Osterzgebirge
History of the Ore Mountains